The Mrs. Carter Show World Tour was the fifth concert tour by American singer-songwriter Beyoncé. Announced in February 2013 with initial dates in Europe and North America, the tour contained seven legs and 132 shows. It began in Belgrade, Serbia on April 15, 2013, and concluded in Lisbon, Portugal on March 27, 2014.

Its title is a reference to her marriage with American rapper Shawn "Jay-Z" Carter, who made multiple guest appearances throughout the tour.

The tour featured royal themes with the singer emulating different queens through her fashion for which she collaborated with numerous designers and fashion houses. The set list of the shows in 2013 included songs from all four studio albums of Beyoncé's solo career. After the release of her eponymous fifth studio album, the 2014 shows were changed to incorporate tracks from the album. The tour was lauded by music critics who praised Beyoncé for her energetic performances, dancing and vocal abilities. The show was directed and choreographed by Frank Gatson Jr.

Following the announcement of the tour, all the tickets made available for the shows sold out, which prompted more dates to be added to the itinerary. The tour grossed $188.6 million in 2013 and the 2014 shows grossed $41.1 million, bringing the tour's total gross revenue to $229.7 million. This made The Mrs. Carter Show World Tour the highest-grossing female and solo tour of 2013. Performances of a number of songs from the tour were broadcast and behind-the-scenes footage was released.

Background 

During a press conference for Super Bowl XLVII on January 31, 2013, Beyoncé revealed that she would make an announcement after her performance at the halftime show and added that "fans should just stay tuned to see". Beyoncé announced the tour and its name after her performance the Super Bowl XLVII halftime show on February 3. The tour's title refers to her marriage with Shawn 'Jay-Z' Carter. However, the official poster of the tour with the name written on it was leaked on the ticket's website Live Nation prior to the official announcement. It shows Beyoncé wearing a Victorian golden royal top and a crown, referencing Queen Elizabeth I. Rosie Swash of The Guardian described it as a "visual stamp of authority". Along with the tour's name, initial dates in Europe and North America were announced, and later more were added in Latin America, Australia, and New Zealand.

Following the announcement of the tour's title, Beyoncé was criticized by several critics and feminists alike for entitling it after her husband's name as she has been regarded as a feminist. Questions were raised about how Beyoncé agreed to be known as a bride of another celebrity person. During an interview with Vogue, Beyoncé described herself as a "modern-day feminist" and further spoke about her decision to reference her husband's name: "I feel like Mrs. Carter is who I am, but more bold and more fearless than I've ever been..... It comes from knowing my purpose and really meeting myself once I saw my child. I was like, 'OK, this is what you were born to do'. The purpose of my body became completely different." After the second European leg was announced on December 11, 2013, a new poster was revealed and used for the promotion of all the newly added shows.

Development 

The concert at The O2 Arena in London was announced on February 3, along with a short advertisement for the tour; an extended version of the clip appeared in late February. Beyonce was dresses in a golden corset and a royal gown to whoo the crowd. She is seen walking into a dance hall in slow-motion with several servants and a DJ, dressed as a jester tries to distract her. The end of the advertisement shows black-and-white snippets of behind-the-scenes footage of the video. Alexis L. Loinaz of E! compared her aristocratic look in the video to Marie Antoinette, Queen Elizabeth I, and Lady Gaga. In March 2013, Beyoncé posted a new poster for the tour on her official Facebook page showing her striking four different poses, wearing a blond wig, a white top and blue shorts. In May 2013, Beyoncé launched an online store for the tour in which different clothes were available for purchase. The following month, she added a limited edition to her Heat line of perfumes, titled Heat: The Mrs. Carter Show World Tour. Inspired by the tour, Beyoncé stated that the fragrance was meant to "give them [fans] a special remembrance of this tour and... reflect the power, passion and playfulness I put into my performances".

On April 24, 2013, it was announced by Beyoncé's publicist that all photographers except Beyoncé's personal photographer Frank Micelotta, were banned from the tour stating that "no photo credentials" will be present. The ban was interpreted as a reaction to the "unflattering" pictures from Beyoncé's Super Bowl XLVII halftime performance showing her "jubilant exertions", that appeared on websites such as Gawker and BuzzFeed. The pictures were not removed even after her publicist Yvette Noel-Schure asked the websites through an e-mail to change their articles, using "some better photos". On May 13, 2013, the general counsel of the National Press Photographers Association (NPPA) Mickey H. Osterreicher, wrote a letter to Noel-Schure on behalf of 19 other organizations requesting from him to "immediately revise your guidelines to restore photo credentialing" for the rest of the tour in Europe and the US. For the tour, the singer took part in "Miss A Meal", a food-donation campaign and supported the charity Goodwill during her tour, where fans were asked to bring food, clothes and household goods at the stops. Throughout the tour, an auction for the campaign was held by Beyoncé and her mother, Tina Knowles, on the website Charitybuzz in which the auction value was $25,000. The winner got a chance to work behind the scenes of Beyoncé's concert in Los Angeles and assist Knowles in the wardrobe department, got a VIP ticket for the concert and had a personal meeting with the singer.

Eight hundred dancers auditioned to be included in Beyoncé's performance at the Super Bowl XLVII halftime show and a selected group of them, consisting only of females, were chosen for the performance as well as for the tour. French dancing duo Les Twins also accompanied Beyoncé on stage performing street dances. Three backing singers The Mamas, and an eleven-piece female band who had also supported the singer during her previous tours performed during the concerts. Two stages were used during the performances: a main stage where the singer performed throughout most of the concert and a B-stage closer to the audience where she was transferred with a rope, flying over the crowd midway through the set, performing three songs there. The set list of the 2013 portion of the tour included approximately twenty five songs from Beyoncé's four solo studio albums: Dangerously in Love (2003), B'Day (2006), I Am... Sasha Fierce (2008), and 4 (2011). The majority of the songs originated from 4 – seven songs were performed from that album. Many of the tracks performed contained different choreographies and arrangements compared to the previous performances by the singer; several of them were intertwined with other artists' material. For the 2014 shows many of the previously performed songs were removed and eight new songs from Beyoncé's fifth self-titled studio album were added to the concert's set list.

Fashion 

For the 2013 shows, Beyoncé worked with multiple designers for the tour's costumes including Emilio Pucci, Riccardo Tisci from Givenchy, The Blonds, Julien MacDonald, Dean and Dan Caten (DSQUARED2), creative director Tamara Ralph of Ralph & Russo who was personally requested by the singer to design an outfit, David Koma, Alon Livne, Vrettos Vrettakos designers from Kenzo, Gucci, Roberto Cavalli and Dennis Kolpodinos. For the performance at the 2013 Made in America, Beyoncé wore a new costume designed by Timothy White, accompanied with shoes made by Reed Krakoff. The outfit designed by DSQUARED2 was from their spring/summer 2013 collection at the Glamazon catwalk show and was inspired by models of the '90s. Several costumes were also designed by Emilio Pucci's Peter Dundas who described them as a "modern take on glamour", taking them from his fall/winter 2013 collection. He focused on the singer being able to perform the choreography during her performances. Stuart Weitzman designed the shoes for Beyoncé, her back-up dancers and band collaborating with stylists Ty Hunter, Raquel Smith, and Beyoncé's mother Tina Knowles. Weitzman created them in different colors with military elements. Beyoncé wanted Weitzman to focus on her being able to dance wearing the shoes without noticing they were on her feet.

One of Beyoncé's costumes which was worn during the first concerts was a gold bodysuit designed by The Blonds embellished with golden breasts complete with a nipple detail. The costume was a collaboration between the group, Beyoncé, Knowles, and Hunter. It was hand embroidered in 600 hours with approximately 30,000 Swarovski crystals. According to The Blonds, it was meant to give the illusion of being covered in crystallized honey and reflect Beyoncé's personality for the tour. They were inspired by Beyoncé's songs of female empowerment and female nudes painted by Tamara de Lempicka. The costume received wide media and fan attention and divided critics' opinions. InStyles Meghan Blalock described the costume as the "most scandalous" that the singer has worn in her career. For the 2014 shows, the singer wore numerous new designs collaborating again with DSQUARED2, Givenchy, Pucci and Weitzman as well as with new designers such as Tom Ford, Versace and Karen Langley.

Beyoncé's makeup for the tour focused on trying to emulate cosmic stars with the underlying themes based on the stratosphere. Other references used as inspiration for the makeup included: film noir, 60's London, cyber beauty, cosmic constellations, and felines. The tourbook for The Mrs. Carter Show was meant to artistically illustrate all the different visual aspects of the tour through multi-media collage and image manipulation. By using collage, Beyoncé's team created images inspired by the singer and her songs and image manipulation was explored, with photos being solarized, layered and stacked. With the tourbook, fans had an opportunity to "bring a part of the tour home with them", as Beyoncé's team stated. A dress created by Amato Haute Couture's Furne One which was worn by Beyoncé for the tour book was originally designed and worn by Estonian singer-songwriter Kerli during her Utopia EP photoshoot, who praised the look after seeing it.

The concert included many costume changes during which video interludes were projected on the screen during the singer's absence. An 18th Century France influence was found in the white-powder makeup and the opening costume as well as a Louis XVI theme throughout the show with oversized wigs and bustiers. The dresses and looks were also noted to channel queens Marie Antionette, Cleopatra, and Elizabeth I by several critics. The Observers Kitty Empire described the concert as a fashion show with a regal, Dangerous Liaisons theme. Jocelyn Vena of MTV News described the costumes as "Eye-catching... dazzling... [and] provocative". Rosa Silverman of The Daily Telegraph commented that Beyoncé was "mesmerizing the crowds with her showstopping outfits... she took to the stage in a series of racy costumes that made no attempt to hide her famous curves." Erika Ramirez of Billboard commented that most of Beyoncé's "stunning" costumes were dazzled with sequins.

Concert synopsis

2013 shows 

The concert opened with a pre-recorded video montage showing black and white footage of gothic architecture as well as dancers dressed in white, marching across a stage length screen, preparing to crown Beyoncé who was dressed as a queen. The montage continued as female dancers wearing hoop-skirt cages and masks started appearing on stage. The video wall raised afterwards and a brief pyrotechnics display began as Beyoncé appeared onstage standing for several seconds prior to the performance of "Run the World (Girls)" preceded by an extended timpani interlude. She sang the song while performing a choreography which included a routine of faux kicking her male dancers. "End of Time" followed with Beyoncé dancing as fireworks were also displayed on stage. "Flaws and All" was performed as the third song on the set list with Beyoncé dedicating it to her fan group, the BeyHive. "If I Were a Boy" was mashed with The Verve's song "Bitter Sweet Symphony" taking the latter's string motif and incorporating several lines. "Get Me Bodied" saw Beyoncé interacting with the audience through call and response, asking them to repeat "Hey, Mrs. Carter". "Baby Boy" was performed against a holographic background as Beyoncé and several female dancers performed synchronised moves in front of the screen which flashed realistic images of more identical dancers. The singer concluded the song with a Dutty Wine dance at the end of the performance, before immediately continuing with "Diva" which was set to the groove of "Clique". "Naughty Girl" was later performed into a neon strip-lit with a snippet of Donna Summer's "Love to Love You Baby" interpolated within it. Beyoncé also performed a seductive dance in front of an open fire display onstage. "Party" was performed after with a prominent Las Vegas showgirl theme. For "Freakum Dress" two ballerinas appeared on stage and performed a choreography along with a video projection on the screen. Beyoncé later appeared in a deep-plunging, thigh-high split long red dress performing the song along with her dancers.

For "I Care" the singer was dressed in a black leather fedora, seated on a bar stool. Beyoncé sang "I Miss You" while shadow dancing was illustrated on the screen behind her. "Schoolin' Life" was performed with a light show complete with '80s neon lights while she performed a dance routine with her dancers. An uptempo version of "Why Don't You Love Me" with a choreography by Beyoncé and Les Twins was preceded by a video projection showing a vintage montage of her. The singer performed the song with a call and response interaction between her and the audience dressed in a 1920s fringed dress. The performance of "1+1" saw Beyoncé in a blue cat-suit kneeling and laying atop a grand piano. During the end of "1+1", she was transformed from the main stage to the "Bey-stage", located closer to the crowd with a wire through a cloud of glitter. "Irreplaceable" was performed after that with an audience sing-along. "Love on Top" and an abbreviated version of Destiny's Child's "Survivor" followed; Beyoncé dedicated the latter song to the members of the aforementioned girl group, Kelly Rowland and Michelle Williams. Beyoncé was taken back to the main stage being transferred with the same wire. "Crazy in Love" was the first song performed on the main stage with a new brassy arrangement, different from Beyoncé's other live performances of the song. During "Single Ladies (Put a Ring on It)", she integrated a snippet from the song "Movin' on Up". Images of pyramids, animated lions and elephants and a portrait of the singer wearing a Nefertiti-style crown were displayed on the screen before the performance of "Grown Woman", keeping in line with the song's African influence. During the performance, the singer and her dancers wore African-inspired costumes. A montage was shown with the song "I Was Here" being played in the background showing footage of the singer with Barack Obama, taking part in charity work, during a vacation with Jay-Z and excerpts of her 2013 performance at the Super Bowl. An a cappella performance of the opening lines of "I Will Always Love You" preceded "Halo" as the closing song of the concert. "Green Light" and "Suga Mama" were used for the encore of the concert at numerous stops.

2014 shows 

The performances of the songs that had already been performed during the 2013 shows remained the same; however some of them were shortened and mixed together. Many new songs from the singer's fifth album were added to the set list with a specific staging and theme. The projections shown on the stage followed the concept behind the singer's visual album. The performance of "Flawless", the second song on the set, opened with the words from Chimamanda Ngozi Adichie's TED talk projected with big letters on the screen and later Beyoncé performed a choreography with her female dancers similarly to the song's music video. A performance of "Yoncé" followed with a new choreography with her dancers. "Blow" was merged with "Naughty Girl" (2003) and featured a burlesque and disco-era theme. During the end of the performance a projection of Pac-Man, the character of the game with the same name, eating cherries was projected on an LED screen onstage. "Partition" was performed in a similar fashion to its music video with Beyoncé appearing with a silhouette, dancing on a couch in front of a purple light. For "Drunk in Love", the singer performed a choreographed chair dance. During "Haunted", strobing lights and dancers were present on stage. "Heaven" and "XO" were performed as the concert's last songs along with "Halo".

Critical reception 

Mike Wass from the website Idolator called the show a "concert extravaganza in the style of Michael Jackson or Madonna" praising the fact that the singer made a progress in the production values compared with her previous performances, mostly due to the expensive and high-quality visual projections which "create atmosphere and add another layer to the production". He further praised the singer's "extraordinary talent" during the performances hailing her as "the greatest entertainer of her generation" after seeing the show which showcased "an icon at top of her game". Tiffany Poole from The Oklahoman praised the fashion, video backdrops and "some of the most impersonated dance moves on YouTube" concluding, "To say that Beyoncé puts on a good show would be grossly understated." Billboard writer Gail Mitchell hailed the concert as a "musical and visual extravaganza" complete with a kaleidoscope of colorful imagery and dancing, which according to him enhanced the music complete with the singer's strong vocals, rather than overshadowing it. He concluded that the tour claimed "the multi-talented artist's intent to join the rarefied ranks of ultimate entertainer".

Nick Hasted of The Independent wrote that the tour followed the stadium trends containing "big-budget movie clips and Broadway musical dance moves, with platoons of backing singers and dancers acting as extras" further hailing it as a "Cecil B. DeMille spectacle". He finished his reviews by concluding, "what makes this show's largely enervating juggernaut breathe is Beyoncé's tireless physical effort. She has created a literal body of work".
Alexis Petridis of The Guardian who compared the singer's performance with Tina Turner praised the show's "bombastic" opening and wrote that "there's something powerful and relentless" about it. He concluded "while onstage Beyoncé feels weirdly unassailable". Mikael Wood of Los Angeles Times noted, "What left the deepest impression was something far more elemental: Beyoncé's ability to make self-aggrandizement seem like an expression of humility... [Her] ambition seemed in proportion with her fans' expectations; she came by the sense of scale honestly." The Observers Kitty Empire highlighted the art direction of the show as "nothing short of breathtaking, making awesome and repeated use of silhouette, of great white blocks of video screens, of live dancers interacting with video". She praised the singer's "fierce" tireless dancing and concluded, "But for all the hauteur here, in couture and bearing, Beyoncé delivers genuine warmth at close range." Bernadette McNulty from The Daily Telegraph found "air of an ancient goddess worship ceremony... [and] of an expensive revue show" in the concert. Although she felt that the choreographies often outshined the music, McNulty concluded: "Yet Beyonce was never less than compelling to watch, and often blistering in her vocal attack".

Philip Matusavage of musicOMH praised Beyoncé's abilities to perform live, calling her "insanely talented" and considered the performance at the B-stage a show highlight; however he commented that the production values of the show, consisting solely of a video screen were "relatively low-key" compared to other pop arena concerts. Matusavage further criticized the repetition of the songs and dance routines which had been previously performed during the singer's other concerts as the tour's "most notable problem". Shirley Halperin of The Hollywood Reporter felt that the singer "tore through her... set with the ferocity of a grown woman who has something to prove" and felt that she tried "her damnedest to win the crowd over with an equal dose of sex appeal and good old-fashioned hyping" further showcasing "unequaled showmanship and those killer vocals" which placed her at the top of R&B music.

However Halperin criticized the show's set list mainly due to the majority of the songs from the album 4, writing, "Bey sounded terrific on all, of course, but with a... ready-to-party audience angling to groove in the aisles, rather than sway with their hands to the heavens, overall it missed the mark." Digital Spys Robert Copsey praised the high-energy nature of the show with vigorous dancing and "blistering" pace but felt that there was a lack of hits performed in the show's first half. NME editor Emily Mackay echoed his statements giving a mixed review for the tour, further criticizing the lack of hits in the set list and adding that only a "paucity of material" was incorporated in the set. She further dismissed the placement of interlude films in the show. A negative review came from San Jose Mercury News Jim Harrington who called the tour "flawed", criticized its set list consisting of "plenty of filler[s]" and the many dissipating costume changes she went through for the show. He further noted that the singer looked and sounded well but blamed the way the show and the production were choreographed.

The revamped show in 2014 received acclaim by critics. Isabel Mohan from The Daily Telegraph acclaimed the revamped show praising the singer's sex appeal and noted that although the set included many new songs, the singer "remained strikingly composed and confident throughout a show which proved her talent, charisma and awe-inspiring thighs". Sidney Madden who praised the upgraded set list further commended the show's fashion. Digital Spys Robert Copsey felt that the show's set list was better than the original one, describing the tour as "wall-to-wall amazing Beyoncé". He concluded in his review, "The relentless pace, ever-changing visuals and sheer amount of songs crammed into the set is a lot to take in, let alone the fact that Beyoncé delivers the entire thing with power yet impeccable ease. When it comes to putting on a show of this calibre, these days she's really only competing with herself." The Observers Kitty Empire praised the singer's raunchiness during the tour different from the other performers and concluded by writing, "There is no question as to Beyoncé's own powers. She can stop and start her all-female band... with a click of her fingers, and keep climbing octaves until you think her lungs are about to jump out of her chest. She sings (with a range that only gets wider and deeper with every tour) and dances (flawlessly) for more than one and a half hours." David Pollock of The Independent felt that, "this near two-hour epic is a ferocious distillation of musical styles old and new and a stunning declaration of intent that Knowles intends to be recognised as the defining pop artist of her era. It was, at the very least, one of the hardest working shows likely to be witnessed on a stage this year, and with barely a drop of minutely-choreographed sweat to be seen."

The tour received a nomination in the category for Choice Summer Tour at the 2013 Teen Choice Summer Tour losing to One Direction's Take Me Home Tour. It was also nominated for Concert Marketing & Promotion Award and Eventful Fans' Choice Award at the 2013 Billboard Music Awards. The tour is nominated in the category for Best Tour at the 2014 Billboard Mid-Year Music Awards.

Commercial performance 
Following the general on-sale of tickets, tour stops in several cities across America sold out in minutes after being announced. Due to the high demand, one extra show was added in Amsterdam, one extra show in Antwerp, two extra shows in London and a third date in Manchester. In North America, extra dates were added in Washington, D.C. Los Angeles and New York City. Phone firm O2, which was behind the pre-sale of the UK shows, said it could have sold out London's O2 Arena 150 times with the number of website hits with a spokesman noting the "unprecedented level of demand from O2 customers looking to buy tickets". Following the frenzied rush for tickets during the general sale, the UK tour had completely sold out within three minutes. Tickets for Rock in Rio became available for general sale on April 4, 2013 and within two hours, the first day of the festival, in which Beyoncé was headlining, had sold out all 65,000 tickets. 20,000 tickets had already sold out from the pre-sale a few months before. On July 7, 2013, Beyoncé's performance at the Essence Music Festival broke the attendance record with over 70,000 people in attendance. On June 24, 2013, a second wave of tour dates were announced via Beyoncé's official website. Included in this was a second US leg as well as a Latin American leg, containing multiple stadium dates in Brazil. It was revealed that Beyoncé set the record for the highest number of concert attendees in Brazil for the year 2013, with more than 230,000 fans attending her 5 shows in the country. 

On July 7, 2013, the Australasia leg of the tour was announced, with dates set for shows in Australia and New Zealand, where Beyoncé held a concert for the first time in her career. Fan club tickets for the October 18, 2013 show in Auckland, New Zealand sold out in 3 minutes. The general sale for the New Zealand shows became available to the public on July 19, 2013 and within 15 minutes all allocations of tickets were sold out for the three shows. A fourth and final Auckland show was then added. Promoter Live Nation confirmed The Mrs. Carter Show World Tour was officially the fastest selling tour of all time at Vector Arena. It also became the concert with the highest attendance at Vector Arena by a solo artist, with 44,596 tickets sold. Beyoncé's two shows at the Perth Arena went on to hold the number one and two spots for highest attendance in a single show, dethroning previous record holder Pink. It was then announced that Beyoncé's Australasian leg of the tour was one of the most successful tours in the continent from any artist, playing for more than 220,000 fans and earning 40 million Australian dollars.

On December 11, 2013, a second European leg through 2014 was announced bringing the total number of shows to 132, thus becoming Beyoncé's longest running tour to date. Similar to the first European leg, a frenzied rush for tickets, further enhanced by the release of the singer's self-titled fifth studio album three days before ticket sales began, resulted in extra dates being added for all United Kingdom shows, Dublin, Cologne, Amsterdam and Antwerp. For the second European leg, Beyoncé had beaten the record she herself had set earlier in the year, by selling 40,000 tickets in under one hour for the two 2014 concerts at Antwerp. Pollstar ranked The Mrs. Carter Show at number 2 on its year-end chart of the top twenty grossing worldwide tours with a gross of $188.6 million from the 2013 shows. Tickets were sold with an average gross of $2,449,248 per city. In April 2014, Billboard reported that Beyoncé's 2014 European shows grossed $41.1 million and played for an audience of 384,730. This brought The Mrs. Carter Show World Tour's total gross to $229.7 million when combined with the 107 shows performed in 2013, and the total attendance to 2,082,848, averaging 15,779 attendance and $1.74 million gross per night. The tour was Beyoncé's highest grossing to date before being surpassed by The Formation World Tour which grossed over $256 million.

Broadcasts and recordings 

Professional footage from the tour was officially released on April 22, 2013 through Beyoncé's YouTube channel and website. It showed the opening moments of the show and performances of "Run the World (Girls)", "Love on Top" and "Halo" during the first concerts. A series of eight behind-the-scenes footage of the rehearsals and preparations for the tour were released on Beyoncé's website on May 21, 2013. During "The Sound of Change Live" charity concert held at Twickenham Stadium in London on June 1, 2013, various clips and performances were broadcast worldwide to over 150 countries which were believed to have reached over 1 billion people.

A thirty-second trailer for the tour was released on June 24, 2013 containing live vocals of Beyoncé's "Get Me Bodied" and a dubstep audio mix. It showed footage from the tour's commercial and multiple snippets of live performances from the show. On August 29, 2013, Beyoncé posted a video titled "Bey Good" on her official website showing scenes of her with fans backstage and during the concerts. During Beyoncé's performance at the Made in America Festival, the two opening songs—"Run the World (Girls)" and "End of Time"—were streamed live via YouTube. Beyoncé's performance at Rock in Rio was broadcast in its entirety, and also streamed via YouTube. On August 22, 2013, Beyoncé released a black-and-white promotional retro video for the tour dates in Brazil. It was set to Frank Sinatra's version of the song "The Girl from Ipanema". The video featured the singer in a bikini swimming in the water, writing Brazil in the sand and relaxing on a hammock as well as various shots of the city.

In March 2014, a new promotional video was released midway through the second European leg and first leg of the 2014 tour. This was the first venture of the tour to include new performances and songs from Beyoncé's recently released self-titled fifth studio album. The video showed professional clips from some new performances and also featured a variety of backstage activity from the revamped tour. A video titled "Goodbye to The Mrs. Carter Show World Tour" was uploaded by the singer on her official YouTube channel on March 27, 2014 showing portions of live performances from the final leg of the tour, behind the scenes moments and visits to cities as "XO" was played in the background. In June 2014 it was announced that HBO would air Beyonce: X10, a 10-episode series of four-minute segments of concert performances debuting weekly before new episodes of True Blood starting June 29. The performances were captured in various cities during the tour. They are included on a bonus disc in the platinum edition release of Beyoncé's 2013 self-titled album, which was released on November 24, 2014.

Set list 
{{hidden
| headercss = background: #FFE6FF; font-size: 100%; width: 90%;
| contentcss = text-align: left; font-size: 100%; width: 90%;
| header = 2013
| content = 
"Run the World (Girls)"
"End of Time"
"Flaws and All"
"If I Were a Boy" / "Bitter Sweet Symphony"
"Get Me Bodied"
"Baby Boy" 
"Diva"
"Naughty Girl" 
"Party"
"Freakum Dress"
"I Care"
"I Miss You"
"Schoolin' Life"
"Why Don't You Love Me"
"1+1" 
"Irreplaceable"
"Love On Top"
"Survivor"
"Crazy in Love"
"Single Ladies (Put a Ring on It)" / "Movin' on Up"
Encore
"I Will Always Love You" 
"Halo"
}}

{{hidden
| headercss = background: #FFE6FF; font-size: 100%; width: 90%;
| contentcss = text-align: left; font-size: 100%; width: 90%;
| header = 2014
| content = 
"Run the World (Girls)"
"Bow Down" / "Flawless" / "Yoncé"
"Get Me Bodied" 
"Baby Boy"
"Diva
"Naughty Girl"
"Blow"
"Partition"
"Haunted"
"Drunk in Love"
"1+1"
"Why Don't You Love Me"
"Irreplaceable"
"Love On Top"
"Crazy in Love"
"Single Ladies (Put a Ring on It)"
”Grown Woman”
"I Will Always Love You" / "Heaven"
"XO"
Encore
"Halo"
}}

Shows

Personnel 

Creative direction
Beyoncé – show direction, staging, choreography
Frank Gatson – show direction, staging, choreographer, creative director
Tina Knowles – creative consultant, stylist
Ty Hunter – stylist

Tour management
Alan Floyd – tour manager
Justin Hylton-Williams –tour manager
Marlon Bowers – assistant tour manager
Larry Beyince – tour assistant
Daniel Kernan – tour accountant
Josh Katzman – tour accountant

Suga Mama band
Derek Dixie– Music Director
Cora Coleman-Dunham – band leader, drummer (2013)
Rie Tsuji – musical director, keyboards
Bibi McGill – guitar
Katty Rodriguez-Harrold – tenor saxophone
Crystal J. Torres – trumpet
Lauren Taneil – bass
Adison Evans – alto saxophone
Dani Ivory – additional keyboard
Venzella Joy – drummer (2014)

The Mamas (background vocalists)
Montina Cooper
Crystal A. Collins
Tiffany Moníque Riddick

Dancers
Ashley Everett – female dance captain
Kimberly "Kimmie" Gipson – female dance captain
Amandy Fernandez
Hannah Douglass
Tanesha "KSYN" Cason
Kim Gingras
Denee (Dnay) Baptiste
Sarah Burns (left after the 2013 leg)
Hajiba Fahmy (left after the 2013 leg)
Les Twins

Choreographers
Jaquel Knight
Chris Grant

Assistant choreographers
Christian Owens 
Sean Bankhead
Les Twins
Dana Foglia 
Mishai Peyronelli
Bianca Li
Darrell Grand Moulfree
Amy Hall Garner
Sheryl Murakami
Michelle Robinson
Anthony Burrell
Denee (Dnay) Baptise
James Alsop
Jefferey Page

Security
Julius DeBoer – head security for Beyoncé
Kelly Samlelen – security for Beyoncé
Bob Fontenot – venue security

Tour book
Milan Zrnic – creative director
David Roemer – photographer

Credits and personnel are taken from the Official The Mrs. Carter Show World Tour Program.

Notes

References

External links 

2013 concert tours
2014 concert tours
Beyoncé concert tours
Concert tours of North America
Concert tours of the United States
Concert tours of Canada
Concert tours of Mexico
Concert tours of Europe
Concert tours of the United Kingdom
Concert tours of France
Concert tours of Germany
Concert tours of Ireland
Concert tours of Oceania
Concert tours of Australia
Concert tours of New Zealand
Concert tours of South America